Live in NYC is a live album and DVD by American alternative rock band Jane's Addiction, released on July 8, 2013 in the UK and July 9 in North America. The album was recorded at Terminal 5 on July 25, 2011, and featured the world concert premiere of their new single "Irresistible Force".

The album is the band's first fully live release since its 1987 debut, Jane's Addiction.

Track listing
 "Whores"
 "Ain't No Right"
 "Just Because"
 "Ted, Just Admit It..."
 "Been Caught Stealing"
 "Irresistible Force (Met the Immovable Object)"
 "Up the Beach"
 "Ocean Size"
 "Three Days"
 "Mountain Song"
 "Stop!"
 "Jane Says"

Personnel

Jane's Addiction
Perry Farrell - vocals
Dave Navarro - guitars
Stephen Perkins - drums, percussion
Chris Chaney - bass guitar

References

Jane's Addiction albums
2013 live albums